Mongolia participated in the 1974 Asian Games held in Tehran, Iran from 1 to 16 September 1974. Athletes from Mongolia won overall 15 medals, including two gold, and finished tenth in a medal table.

Medal summary

Medals by sport

Medalists

Athletics

Boxing

Shooting

Weightlifting

Wrestling

References

Nations at the 1974 Asian Games
1974
Asian Games